South Brighton is a small, primarily residential suburb of Adelaide in South Australia.

Brighton South Post Office opened on 7 November 1961. It was renamed South Brighton in 1968 and replaced by the Seacliff Park office in 1995.

References

Suburbs of Adelaide